The 1974–75 South-West Indian Ocean cyclone season was a below-average cyclone season. The season officially ran from November 1, 1974, to April 30, 1975.

Systems

Tropical Disturbance Adele

Adele existed from December 23 to December 24.

Intense Tropical Cyclone Blandine

Blandine existed from January 6 to January 12.

Tropical Cyclone Camille

This system formed southeast of the Seychelles on January 7 before becoming disorganized while interacting with northern Madagascar.  The system redeveloped as a hurricane-force cyclone in the northern Mozambique Channel on January 16 before moving southeast into Madagascar on January 19.

Intense Tropical Cyclone Robyn–Deborah

This system existed from January 14 to January 24.

Tropical Depression Elsa

Elsa existed from January 25 to January 27.

Tropical Disturbance Fernande

This storm lasted for only 18 hours on February 1.

Very Intense Tropical Cyclone Gervaise

The origins of Cyclone Gervaise were in early February 1975 from a circular area of convection, or thunderstorms, located in the Intertropical Convergence Zone southwest of Diego Garcia in the south-west Indian Ocean. The system organized as it moved generally to the southwest, a trajectory it would maintain for several days due to a subtropical ridge to its southeast, and an area of low pressure near the Mascarene Islands. On February 2, the Mauritius Meteorological Services named the storm Gervaise. Two days later, the storm attained hurricane status, or maximum sustained winds of at least . Late on February 5, Gervaise passed about 100 km (60 mi) southeast of St. Brandon. Continuing southwestward, the cyclone struck Mauritius on February 6, with the calm of the eye lasting for three hours. The track shifted to the south and southeast over time, steered by a passing cold front. On February 10, Gervaise dissipated within the cold front.

Cyclone Gervaise killed 10 people during its passage of Mauritius. Heavy rainfall affected the island for several days, reaching  at Grosse Roche. The high winds knocked down power lines, radio transmission with Vacoas for 24 hours, and many crops. About 25% of the island's sugar cane crop was lost. The storm damaged several houses, leaving thousands homeless. Gervaise also dropped heavy rainfall on the island, reaching  at Plaine des Cafres. It caused substantial damage to properties, vegetation and wildlife. Moored yachts around the coast were washed hundreds of yards inland in places due to the storm surge and in the Mauritian capital Port Louis, a cargo ship of ca. 10,000 tonnes was washed up on to the quay. 34 injured, 3,706 homeless.

Tropical Cyclone Helose

Helose existed from February 19 to February 26.

Severe Tropical Storm Ines

Ines existed from March 9 to March 19.

Severe Tropical Storm Junon

Junon existed from April 18 to April 22.

Season effects

|-
| Norah	||  || bgcolor=#| || bgcolor=#| || bgcolor=#|  || Christmas Island, Cocos Island ||  ||  ||
|-
| Adele	||  || bgcolor=#| || bgcolor=#| || bgcolor=#| || Christmas Island, Cocos Island ||  ||  ||
|-
| Blandine ||  || bgcolor=#| || bgcolor=#| || bgcolor=#| || None ||  ||  ||
|-
| Camille ||  || bgcolor=#| || bgcolor=#| || bgcolor=#| || None ||  ||  ||
|-
| Robyn–Deborah ||  || bgcolor=#| || bgcolor=#| || bgcolor=#| || None ||  ||  ||
|-
| Elsa ||  || bgcolor=#| || bgcolor=#| || bgcolor=#| || None ||  ||  ||
|-
| Fredegonde ||  || bgcolor=#| || bgcolor=#| || bgcolor=#| || None ||  ||  ||
|-
| Ghislaine ||  || bgcolor=#| || bgcolor=#| || bgcolor=#| || None ||  ||  ||
|-
| Gervaise ||  || bgcolor=#| || bgcolor=#| || bgcolor=#| || None ||  ||  ||
|-
| Helose ||  || bgcolor=#| || bgcolor=#| || bgcolor=#| || None ||  ||  ||
|-
| Ines ||  || bgcolor=#| || bgcolor=#| || bgcolor=#| || None ||  ||  ||
|-
| Junon ||  || bgcolor=#| || bgcolor=#| || bgcolor=#| || None ||  ||  ||
|-

See also

 Atlantic hurricane seasons: 1974, 1975
 Eastern Pacific hurricane seasons: 1974, 1975
 Western Pacific typhoon seasons: 1974, 1975
 North Indian Ocean cyclone seasons: 1974, 1975

Notes

References

South-West_Indian_Ocean
South-West Indian Ocean cyclone seasons